Puneet Mehra (born 6 October 1988) is an Indian former cricketer. He played six List A matches for Delhi between 2010 and 2011.

See also
 List of Delhi cricketers

References

External links
 

1988 births
Living people
Indian cricketers
Delhi cricketers
Place of birth missing (living people)